Athanasius IV may refer to:

 Athanasius IV Salhoyo, Syriac Patriarch of Antioch (r. 986–1002)
 Patriarch Athanasius IV of Alexandria, Greek Orthodox Patriarch of Alexandria (r. 1417–1425)
 Athanasius IV of Constantinople, Ecumenical Patriarch of Constantinople in 1679
 Athanasius IV Jawhar, Greek Catholic Patriarch of Antioch (r. 1788–1794)